The 2018 Akron Zips men's soccer team represented The University of Akron during the 2018 NCAA Division I men's soccer season. The Zips, played in the Mid-American Conference.

Background

Player movement

Departures 
A program record of 19 players departed the program following the 2017 season. Most players either graduated or declared for the MLS SuperDraft while others transferred to local NCAA Division II soccer programs.

Transfers

Recruits

Squad information

Roster

Coaching staff 
{|class="wikitable"
|-
! style="background:#041E42; color:#fff; border:2px solid #A89968;" scope="col" colspan="2"|Front office
|-

|-
! style="background:#041E42; color:#fff; border:2px solid #A89968;" scope="col" colspan="2"|Coaching staff
|-

Schedule 

|-
!colspan=8 style=""| Exhibition
|-

|-
!colspan=8 style=""| Regular Season
|-

|-
!colspan=8 style=""| MAC Tournament
|-

|-
!colspan=8 style=""| NCAA Tournament
|-

|-

Statistics

References 

Akron
Akron Zips men's soccer seasons
Akron
Akron
NCAA Division I Men's Soccer Tournament College Cup seasons